Hewitt is both an English surname and a given name. Notable people with the name include:

Surname

In science and technology 
 Carl Hewitt, American scientist
 Charles Gordon Hewitt (1885–1920), Canadian entomologist
 Edwin Hewitt (1920–1999), mathematician
 Eric John Hewitt (1919–2001), plant physiologist
 Geoffrey Hewitt (1934-2019), chemical engineering professor
 John Hewitt (herpetologist) (1880–1961), British and South African herpetologist and museum curator
 Judi Hewitt, Finnish-New Zealand bio-statistician and soft-sediment benthic ecologist
 Paul G. Hewitt (born 1930), scientist
 Peter Cooper Hewitt (1861–1921), American electrical engineer and inventor of the first mercury-vapor lamp

Soldiers 
 Dennis George Wyldbore Hewitt (1897–1917), First World War Victoria Cross recipient
 Henry Kent Hewitt (1887–1972), US Navy admiral
 Joe Hewitt (RAAF officer) (1901–1985), Royal Australian Air Force air vice marshal
 Captain Peter Hewitt (1720-1773), first rank and file to be granted a commission in the Royal Welch Fusiliers, following the Battle of Fontenoy in 1745.

Politicians 
 Abram Hewitt (1822–1903), American politician, lawyer and iron manufacturer
 Charles J. Hewitt (1867–1940), New York politician
 James Hewitt, 1st Viscount Lifford (1712–1789), Irish lawyer and judge, and Lord Chancellor of Ireland
 Patricia Hewitt (born 1948), UK politician
 Sharon Hewitt (born 1958), American politician, member of the Louisiana State Senate

In film and television 
 Andrew Hewitt (born 1976), British composer for film and television
 Bec Hewitt (born 1983), Australian actress and singer
 Don Hewitt (1922–2009), American television producer, created 60 Minutes
 Henry Charles Hewitt (actor) (1885–1968), British actor
 Jennifer Love Hewitt (born 1979), American actress, producer and singer
 Sean Hewitt (1935-2019), Canadian actor

In radio and journalism 
 Emma Churchman Hewitt (1850–1921), American writer, journalist
 Foster Hewitt (1902–1985), Canadian radio sports broadcaster
 Gavin Hewitt (born 1951), BBC journalist
 Hugh Hewitt (born 1956), American radio talk show host
 W. A. Hewitt (1875–1966), Canadian sports executive and journalist; father of Foster Hewitt

In music 
 Angela Hewitt (born 1958), Canadian pianist
 Emma Hewitt, Australian singer-songwriter 
 Steve Hewitt (born 1971), drummer, Placebo
 Andrew Hewitt (born 1976), British composer

In sports 
 Andrea Hewitt (born 1982), New Zealand professional triathlete
 Bill Hewitt (American football) (1909–1947), football player
 David Hewitt (rugby union, born 1939) (born 1939), Irish rugby player
 Bob Hewitt (born 1940), Australian tennis player; convicted rapist
 Elliott Hewitt (born 1994), Welsh football player
 George Hewitt, English football player
 Glynn Hewitt (born 1953), Australian football player
 Jamie Hewitt (footballer) (born 1968) English football erplayer
 John Hewitt (footballer) (born 1963), Scottish football player
 Lauren Hewitt (born 1978), Australian sprinter
 Len Hewitt (1920–1979), Welsh football player
 Lleyton Hewitt (born 1981), Australian tennis player
 Mike Hewitt (footballer), Scottish football player 
 Norm Hewitt (born 1968), New Zealand rugby player
 Paul Hewitt (born 1963), American college basketball coach
 Ron Hewitt (footballer, born 1928) (1928–2001), Welsh football player
 Ron Hewitt (footballer, born 1924) (1924–2011), English football player
 Ryan Hewitt (born 1991), American football player
 Stephen Hewitt, Australian curler
 Tom Hewitt (footballer) (1889–1980), Welshfootball player

Other 
 James Hewitt (born 1958), lover of Diana, Princess of Wales
 Joanna Hewitt (born 1949), Australian public servant
 John Hewitt (disambiguation), various people
 Lenox Hewitt (1917-2020), Australian public servant
 Marvin Hewitt, American impostor
 Mary E. Hewitt (1807–1884), poet and editor 
 Robert Hewitt, Jr., numismatist

Given name
 Hewitt Bostock (1864–1930), Canadian publisher, businessman and politician
 Hewitt Bouanchaud (1887-1950), Lieutenant Governor of Louisiana
 Hewitt Crane (1927–2008), American engineer

Fictional characters
 Harry Hewitt (Coronation Street), on the soap opera Coronation Street, portrayed by Ivan Beavis
 Concepta Hewitt (née Riley, later Regan), also of Coronation Street, portrayed by Doreen Keogh
 Lucille Hewitt, also of Coronation Street, portrayed by Jennifer Moss
 Christopher Hewitt, also of Coronation Street, portrayed by Victoria Baker as an infant and Stephen Ward as a child
 Christine Hewitt, on the soap opera EastEnders, portrayed by Elizabeth Power
 Jonathan Hewitt, also of EastEnders, portrayed by Jonny Lee Miller
Thomas Hewitt,leatherface

See also
Hewit, surname

English-language surnames